"Rollerblades" is a single by British record producer and singer-songwriter Kwes. It was released as the first single from his debut album to come in 2013.

The single was released as a digital download on 26 November 2012 and was released on 7" vinyl on 21 January 2013.

Song information
Rollerblades has been described as an intimate, lovelorn ode. Rosab, the upcoming b-side instrumental to Rollerblades is described as "a messed up, oneiric instrumental ode to Kwes' bike".

Track listing

References

External links
 Kwes. – Rollerblades (Music Video on YouTube)

2012 singles
2012 songs
Warp (record label) singles